Michele Foscarini (1632 – 1692) was a Venetian historian. He is most notable for his continuation of the History of Venice by Giovan Battista Nani.

Sources 

17th-century Venetian historians
Historians of Italy
1632 births
1692 deaths